The 2022 Boise State Broncos football team represented Boise State University as a member of the Mountain West Conference during the 2022 NCAA Division I FBS football season. They were led by head coach Andy Avalos, who was coaching his second season with the team. The Broncos played their home games at Albertsons Stadium in Boise, Idaho.

Schedule
Boise State and the Mountain West Conference announced the 2022 football schedule on February 16, 2022.

Coaching staff

 

 Support staff
 Vincent Johnson III – Offensive Graduate Assistant
 Keith Price – Offensive Graduate Assistant 
 Keanu Yamamoto – Defensive Graduate Assistant 
 Jason Cverko – Director of Recruiting Operations 
 Joel Schneider –  Director of Football
 Lou Major – Director of Football External Relations 
 Jalyn Baker – Assistant Director of Sports Performance 
 Brandon Pietrzyk – Assistant Director of Sports Performance 
 Lucas White – Assistant Director of Sports Performance 
 Kiyoshi Harris – Director of Recruiting Relations 
 Dontrae Cooper – Recruiting Assistant 
 Brooke Pahukoa – Assistant Director of Football 
 Calin Criner – Defensive Coaching Assistant 
 Taylor Kolste – Offensive Coaching Assistant 

Analysts
 Dirk Koetter – Senior Offensive Analyst
 Ron Collins – Senior Defensive Analyst 
 Michael Frisina – Special Teams Analyst
 Will Heffner – Offensive Analyst
 Jabril Frazier – Defensive Analyst

Rankings

Game summaries

at Oregon State

at New Mexico

No. 16 (FCS) UT Martin

at UTEP

San Diego State

Fresno State

at Air Force

Colorado State

BYU

at Nevada

at Wyoming

Utah State

Fresno State (Mountain West Championship Game)

vs. North Texas (Frisco Bowl)

References

Boise State
Boise State Broncos football seasons
Frisco Bowl champion seasons
Boise State Broncos football